Antipodogomphus edentulus is a species of dragonfly of the family Gomphidae, 
commonly known as the Cape York dragon. 
It is endemic to Cape York, Queensland, Australia, where it has been found in rivers.

Antipodogomphus edentulus is a small to medium-sized black and yellow dragonfly with a long tail.

Gallery

See also
 List of Odonata species of Australia

References

Gomphidae
Odonata of Australia
Endemic fauna of Australia
Taxa named by J.A.L. (Tony) Watson
Insects described in 1991